Out of the Trees is a 1975 television sketch show pilot written by Graham Chapman, Douglas Adams and Bernard McKenna that was broadcast on BBC 2 in 1976. The show shared some of the stream-of-consciousness style of Monty Python's Flying Circus, of which Chapman was a member. Actors included Mark Wing-Davey and Simon Jones.

The concept of the show was, according to Chapman, to follow the exploits of two modern-day linguists who would travel around a Britain gripped in rapid decline. The linguists would comment upon the origins of a word or phrase, which would then be the genesis of a sketch. Although two scripts were written (the second a collaboration between Chapman and David Yallop), only one episode was ever filmed. It was broadcast only once by the BBC, with little promotion, at 10pm on Saturday 10 January 1976 opposite Match of the Day, and so was seen by relatively few people.

It was reported in 2005, by a representative posting on the forum at the archive television website The Mausoleum Club, that a videotape made by Chapman on an obsolete format had been given to the National Film Television and Videotape Archive. It was restored, a process which took 2 years and shown at the National Film Theatre on Saturday, 2 December 2006 as part of the Missing Believed Wiped event. It was shown again on 24 September 2019 as part of the BFI commemoration of fifty years of Python. The original broadcast standard videotape of the show was wiped, as often occurred at the time. The film segments shot in outdoor locations survived, and consist of a sketch titled "Severance of a Peony", and some inserts intended for an item about Genghis Khan. The former was included on the DVD for Adams's 1981 TV series adaptation of The Hitchhiker's Guide to the Galaxy, and also appeared, rewritten as an anecdote, in Chapman's book A Liar's Autobiography. Rewrites of the Genghis Khan sketch appear in some editions of Adams's posthumously published work The Salmon of Doubt as the short story "The Private Life of Genghis Khan".

References

Sources
 orangecow.org
 web.ukonline.co.uk
 news.bbc.co.uk
 bfi.org.uk

External links
 

1975 British television episodes
Television pilots not picked up as a series
BBC Television shows
BBC television sketch shows
Television episodes written by Douglas Adams
Works by Graham Chapman